Julio Alvarado Tricoche (1886–1970) was a Puerto Rican flutist, composer, and director of the Banda Municipal de Ponce for seventeen years.

Early years
Julio Alvarado Tricoche was born on 18 February 1886 in Ponce, Puerto Rico. His father was Spaniard and his mother was Puerto Rican.  Alvarado Tricoche was the first male baby born at the just-built Hospital Valentín Tricoche. As a young man he worked as a blacksmith and a tobacco salesperson before he dedicated the rest of his life to music.

Training
In 1903 he started playing the guitar with music professor Clemente Acosta. He studied music theory and flute with Jesús R. Ramos  Antonini and for his advanced music education Alvarado Tricoche was a student of Domingo Cruz (Cocolía) and Juan Ríos Ovalle.

Music career
Alvarado Tricoche started in the world of music from very young.  He first performed with the flute.

In 1912, Domingo Cruz "Cocolía", then director of the Ponce Municipal Band contracted Julio Alvarado as flutist and conductor.

Alvarado Tricoche initiated his work as a composer in 1914, creating danzas, valses, pasodobles, pasillos, boleros and plenas. Among his favorite themes was love and womanhood. His romantic melodies continue to be played in modern Puerto Rico. Among his best known compositions are Ausencia (1920), Una Noche de Algodon (1926), Ambición (1938), Lejos de ti (1937) and Cenizas (1942).

In 1920, Alvarado Tricoche became director of the Ponce School Band and also joined the Ponce Symphony Orchestra whose conductor was Arturo Pasarell. Concurrent with his duties directing two bands (the municipal and school bands) and as a member of the Symphony Orchestra, he also participated in various local for-profit bands and orchestras working, among them, with Mingo and his Whoopee Kids band as an arranger, guitarist, and flutist.

From 1937 to 1955, he directed the Orchestra at the Ponce Casino and was also a professor of music theory (solfeo) at the Escuela Libre de Música de Ponce, then headquartered at Salud and Cristina streets. In 1953 he became director of the Banda Municipal de Ponce, which he directed until his death.

Death, legacy and honors
Alvarado Tricoche directed the Ponce Municipal Band from 1953 until his death (24 September 1970). He was 84 years old. Under his direction, the Band achieved much recognition and received many accolades, both in Puerto Rico as well as internationally. In Ponce a school was named after him. He is also recognized at the Ponce Tricentennial Park for his contributions to music.

Personal life
Alvarado Tricoche married Georgina Santos and they had six children: Emilio, Georgina, Luisa Angélica, Julio, Antonia and Santiago.

See also

 Juan Morel Campos
 Domingo Cruz "Cocolía"
 Luis Osvaldo Pino Valdivieso
 List of Puerto Ricans
 People from Ponce, Puerto Rico

Notes

References

1886 births
1970 deaths
Musicians from Ponce
Puerto Rican male composers
Puerto Rican composers
20th-century American composers
20th-century American male musicians